The 2009–10 Irish Cup was the 130th edition of Northern Ireland's premier football knock-out cup competition. The competition began on 19 September 2009 with the first Round and ended on 8 May 2010 with the final.

Crusaders were the defending champions, winning their third Irish Cup the previous season after a 1–0 win over Cliftonville in the 2009 final. This season they reached the quarter-finals, but were defeated by Portadown. Linfield went on to lift their 40th Irish Cup, and fourth in five years, beating Portadown 2–1 in the final. Portadown earned a place in the first qualifying round of the 2010–11 UEFA Europa League because Linfield had already qualified for the UEFA Champions League via the 2009–10 IFA Premiership.

Results

First round
The matches were played on 19 September 2009.

|}

Bye: 1st Bangor Old Boys, Albert Foundry, Ards Rangers, Ballymacash Rangers, Banbridge Rangers, Brantwood, Broomhedge, Crumlin United, Dollingstown, Draperstown Celtic, Dromara Village, Dungiven Celtic, Dunmurry Rec., Fivemiletown United, Grove United, Holywood, Killyleagh Youth, Magherafelt Sky Blues, Mosside, Newbuildings United, Omagh United, Raceview, Rathfriland Rangers, Richhill, Saintfield United, Seagoe, Shorts, Sirocco Works, Tandragee Rovers, U.U.J, Warrenpoint Town

Second round
The matches were played on 24 and 31 October 2009.

|colspan="3" style="background:#E8FFD8;"|24 October 2009

|-
|colspan="3" style="background:#E8FFD8;"|31 October 2009

|}

Third round

|colspan="3" style="background:#E8FFD8;"|21 November 2009

|-
|colspan="3" style="background:#E8FFD8;"|28 November 2009

|}

Fourth round

|colspan="3" style="background:#E8FFD8;"|12 December 2009

|-
|colspan="3" style="background:#E8FFD8;"|15 December 2009

|-
|colspan="3" style="background:#E8FFD8;"|19 December 2009

|}

Fifth round

|colspan="3" style="background:#E8FFD8;"|16 January 2010

|-
|colspan="3" style="background:#E8FFD8;"|19 January 2010

|}

Replays

|colspan="3" style="background:#E8FFD8;"|19 January 2010

|-
|colspan="3" style="background:#E8FFD8;"|20 January 2010

|-
|colspan="3" style="background:#E8FFD8;"|27 January 2010

|}

Sixth round

|colspan="3" style="background:#E8FFD8;"|13 February 2010

|-
|colspan="3" style="background:#E8FFD8;"|27 March 2010

|}

Replays

|colspan="3" style="background:#E8FFD8;"|7 April 2010

|}

Quarter-finals

|colspan="3" style="background:#E8FFD8;"|6 March 2010

|-
|colspan="3" style="background:#E8FFD8;"|10 April 2010

|}

Replays

|colspan="3" style="background:#E8FFD8;"|9 March 2010

|}

Semi-finals

|colspan="3" style="background:#E8FFD8;"|10 April 2010

|-
|colspan="3" style="background:#E8FFD8;"|17 April 2010

|}

Final

References

External links
 Official site
 nifootball.co.uk

2009-10
Cup
2009–10 domestic association football cups